Maximilian Hippe (born 6 May 1998) is a German professional footballer who plays as a centre-back for SV Rödinghausen.

Club career
Hippe played youth football for VfL Theesen before signing with SV Rödinghausen in 2015.

Hippe's contract with 1. FC Kaiserslautern was terminated by mutual consent on 27 January 2023.

On 29 January 2023, Hippe returned to SV Rödinghausen.

Career statistics

References

1998 births
Sportspeople from Bielefeld
Footballers from North Rhine-Westphalia
21st-century German people
Living people
German footballers
Association football defenders
SV Rödinghausen players
Borussia Dortmund II players
1. FC Kaiserslautern players
1. FC Kaiserslautern II players
Regionalliga players
3. Liga players
Oberliga (football) players